The Eternals are a fictional race of humanoids appearing in American comic books published by Marvel Comics. They were created by Jack Kirby, making their first appearance in The Eternals #1 (July 1976).

In the Marvel Universe, the Eternals are an offshoot of humanity known as Homo immortalis which were created one million years ago by the enigmatic alien Celestials to defend Earth with their superhuman powers and abilities. Their primary adversaries are the Deviants, who share a similar origin and pose a regular threat to humanity. Due to their virtual immortality, Eternals have largely secluded themselves from humans, with their god-like status forming the basis of various mythological figures around the world.

Since their appearance, the Eternals have had several of their own series, in addition to crossing into other titles, such as Thor and X-Men. They made their debut in the Marvel Cinematic Universe with their own feature film Eternals, directed by Chloé Zhao, which was released November 5, 2021.

Publication history
In 1970, Jack Kirby left Marvel Comics to work at DC Comics, where he began the saga of the New Gods, an epic story involving mythological and science fiction concepts. Though he had planned for a definitive ending, the series was abruptly cancelled. Upon his return to Marvel, Kirby continued exploring his interest in high-concept science fiction through The Eternals.

Originally titled "The Celestials", Marvel changed the title to "Return of the Gods", whose comic book cover bore stylistics similarities to Erich von Daniken's book Chariots of the Gods?. To avoid potential legal issues, the name was again changed to “Eternals". The Eternals' saga was thematically similar to the New Gods', and the series was also eventually canceled without resolving many of its plots. Writers Roy Thomas and Mark Gruenwald used the Eternals in a Thor storyline that concluded in Thor #301, resolving those lingering plotlines. Subsequent to the Thor storyline, the Eternals (and the mythology connected to them) have appeared or been mentioned in numerous Marvel comics. In particular, the Celestials' experiment on humanity has been used to explain how certain humans can develop super-powers. The Titanians (created by Jim Starlin) and Uranians (created by Stan Lee) were later retconned as being Eternals as well.

The Eternals returned for a 12-issue miniseries in 1985 under writer Peter B. Gillis and penciler Sal Buscema. According to comic-book historian Peter Sanderson, "editor in chief Jim Shooter disliked Gillis’s scripts, so Walter Simonson wrote the final four issues."

In 2000, a one-shot comic called New Eternals: Apocalypse Now #1 featured an older conflict between the Eternals and X-Men villain Apocalypse. In 2003, writer Chuck Austen and artist Kev Walker rebooted the franchise for Marvel's mature readers-focused MAX imprint, resulting in The Eternal.

The Eternal series from Marvel's MAX imprint written by Chuck Austen was based on an idea he had been working on for a while: "I pitched this back when I first started working at Marvel, but Joe Quesada was against doing it. He saw no future in this particular old Kirby concept." Austen described the plot as involving "Ikaeden, the leader of the Eternals, who arrives on Earth at the dawn of man, and evolves humankind from homo-erectus so he can use them as slaves to mine raw materials for the Celestials, his bosses, basically," as well as "Kurassus, who is the second-in-command of the mining mission, and who is determined to undermine Ikaeden and kill Ikaeden's precious slave-girl and son." In an interview with Newsarama he gave an outline of his planned plot:

Originally planned as an ongoing series, it was cancelled after six issues.

Neil Gaiman, with artist John Romita, Jr., created a 2006 miniseries, which helped bring the Eternals' role in the modern Marvel Universe up-to-date. Originally solicited as a six-issue series, an extra issue was added to the run, because, according to editor Nick Lowe, "There was too much story to fit into the structure we set for ourselves. Neil was starting issue five and told me that he might need a seventh issue. He just had too much story to fit in six issues (even with the first and sixth double-sized)."

A fourth Eternals series ran as an ongoing series for nine issues and one annual from August 2008 – March 2009.

The Eternals returned in Jason Aaron's Avengers, a story arc involving the Dark Celestials, which saw the Eternals all killed in the fourth issue. However, the characters were resurrected in their new ongoing series launched in January 2021 by writer Kieron Gillen and artist Esad Ribić.

Fictional history
When the Celestials visited Earth one million years ago and performed genetic experiments on early proto-humans, they created two divergent races: the long-lived Eternals, and the genetically unstable and monstrously grotesque Deviants. These experiments also led to the capacity for super-powered mutations in humans. They also performed this experiment on other planets (such as the Kree and Skrull homeworlds) with similar results.

Despite looking human, Eternals are much longer-lived (but were not originally fully immortal) and that kept them from having much contact with their human cousins. Eternals have a low birth rate; they can interbreed with humans but the result is always a normal human (although Joey Athena, son of Thena and a normal human seems to have become an Eternal with long lived properties and powers). Despite this, the Eternals have in general protected the human race, especially from the Deviants, with whom they have always had an enmity. The Eternals also developed advanced technology.

Long ago, a civil war broke out amongst the Eternals over whether to conquer the other races, with one faction led by Kronos and the other by his warlike brother, Uranos. Kronos's side prevailed, and Uranos and his defeated faction left Earth and journeyed to Uranus where they built a colony. Some of Uranos's group soon tried to return to Earth to re-kindle the war, but they were attacked by a passing Kree ship and forced to land on Saturn's moon Titan. There they built another colony (experiments performed by Kree scientists on a captured Eternal led them to go to Earth and perform their own genetic experiments on a group of humans, thus creating the Inhumans).
 
One day, Kronos's experiments in cosmic energy caused a catastrophic release of energy throughout the Eternals' city, Titanos, destroying it, activating latent genes in the Eternals, and disintegrating the scientist's body. The Eternals now found they could channel large quantities of cosmic energy themselves, granting them near-godlike power. The accident left Kronos in an immaterial state, so a new leader had to be chosen. For the first time, the Eternals merged into a single being, the Uni-Mind, to decide which of Kronos's sons, Zuras or A'lars should be the new leader. Zuras was chosen to be the Prime Eternal, and A'lars chose to leave Earth to avoid causing another civil war, and journeyed to Titan.

There he found that a war (allegedly caused by the Dragon of the Moon) had erupted on Titan and wiped out all but one member, a woman named Sui-San. A'lars fell in love with her, and in time they repopulated Titan. Due to the mix of activated genes from A'lars and unactivated ones from Sui-San, these new Titanian Eternals are not as powerful or immortal as Terran Eternals, but are more powerful and longer-lived than the earlier pre-civil war Titanian Eternals.

While Zuras ruled, three new Eternal cities were built. The first was Olympia, located in the mountains of Greece, near the main portal between the Earth dimension and the Olympians' home dimension, which led many ancient Greeks to confuse some of the godlike Eternals with members of the Olympian pantheon. Eventually, an agreement was reached with the gods where some Eternals, such as Thena, would impersonate the Olympians before their worshipers. The other two Eternal cities were Polaria (located in Siberia) and Oceana (in the Pacific).

Eighteen-thousand years ago, the Celestials returned to Earth. The Deviants attacked them, but the Celestials counterattacked, resulting in the sinking of Mu and Atlantis, and much worldwide havoc. The Eternals helped rescue many humans. An Eternal named Valkin was entrusted by the Celestials with an artifact of great power for safekeeping.

At some point during the early centuries, Ikaris and the Eternals came into conflict with the immortal mutant, Apocalypse. This conflict ended when Ikaris and the Eternals defeated him. Ikaris believed Apocalypse was dead.

1,000 years ago, the Asgardian god Thor encountered some Eternals, but the encounter was erased from his mind, to prevent him from learning about the Celestials, who were about to return to Earth. An Eternal named Ajak became the Celestials' spokesperson, and put himself to sleep when the Celestials left, to wait for their return 1,000 years later to judge humanity.

During the early 20th century, a human scientist made contact with the Uranian Eternals and was taken to live with them along with his young son, who would later become Marvel Boy. The Uranians were eventually killed by Deathurge. After World War II, some Eternals allied with humans and Deviants to form the Damocles Foundation, which tried to create a new breed of superhuman to rule Earth. Some Eternals, such as Makkari, were also active as superheroes, or living amongst humans, keeping their true nature hidden. The Eternals also helped to move the Inhumans' city to the Himalayas to keep it hidden.

At some point, Thanos of the Eternals of Titan nearly destroyed their colony, but they rebuilt it, and would help Earth's heroes to oppose him on several occasions.

Modern Age
In recent times, Ikaris met the archaeologist Daniel Damian and his daughter Margo, and accompanied them into an old Eternal city in the Andes, where he awakened Ajak. Ajak began the process to receive the Celestials. These movements alerted the Deviants, who decided to attack New York and to provoke fear in the humans against the coming celestials. When the Celestials returned to judge the worthiness of their creations a few years ago, the Eternals found themselves clashing with the Deviants again, and decided to publicly reveal their existence to humanity. Zuras feared what would happen if the Celestials judged unfavorably. They encountered Thor again, and were attacked by Thor's father Odin and the Olympian gods, who tried to prevent their interfering with the gods' plans to attack the Celestials. Eventually, the Eternals decided to help the gods and formed a Uni-Mind to assist the Destroyer's assault on the Celestials.

They were forced to dissolve back into Eternals by the Celestials, and the shock of the attack killed Zuras. Before his spirit fully left the material plane, he instructed his daughter Thena to take his people to explore space. Since then, the Eternals have helped Earth's heroes, particularly the Avengers, against several menaces. They also discovered the existence of the Titanian Eternals.

Some time later, the Deviant's aristocracy, led by Brother Tode, attacked Olympia, kidnapping the Eternals and intending to disintegrate them. The hero Iron Man (James Rhodes)  rescued the Eternals and helped them defeat the deviants. Then the Eternals transformed the deviant's aristocracy into a synthetic cube, killing them. The Eternals formed a Uni-Mind to discuss their future on earth, after which most of the Eternals (led by Valkin), went to the stars. But a handful – those most heavily involved in Earthly affairs – remained behind on Earth. Thena came to lead the remaining Eternals but she wasn't very respected by her subjects.

With the ascension of Priestlord Ghaur as leader of the Deviants, the Eternals joined the Avengers in defeating him after he absorbed the power of a Celestial and tried to gain godhood. Meanwhile, Ikaris questioned Thena for her poor choices as leader of the Eternals. She was subtly being controlled by a brain mine put in her by Kro. After a special ceremony, Ikaris succeeded her as leader of the Earth's Eternals. The lover of Ikaris, Margo Damian, was captured by Ghaur's minions and was killed as a result of a Deviant experiment on her.

After the death of his daughter, Daniel Damian decided to take revenge against the Deviants and the Eternals. With the help of ancient Eternal machines, he forged a prophecy to incite war between the two races and transformed Ajak in a murderous monster. When his plan was discovered by the Eternals, Ajak reverted to his original form and regretted the killings that he had committed, so he killed Damian and himself.

The Eternals Gilgamesh  and Sersi briefly became part of the Superhero team Avengers. When Sersi became sick with the Mahd Wy'ry disease, a uncurable degenerating Eternal disease, Ikaris and other Eternals tried to bring her to Olympia and perform a rite of Cleansing. Sersi rejected the idea, on the basis that the ritual was designed to kill the infected Eternal, and solicited his family to perform  the Gann Josin bond between her and her lover the Black Knight. Ikaris was furious and performed the bond without consent of the Knight. Later Thena and other Eternals helped the Avengers in the battle against  the Gatherers and Proctor, who was an alternate Black Knight and who infected Sersi with the Mahd Wy'ry disease for spite.

The Eternals fought once more against Ghaur and the Deviants, with the help of the Heroes for Hire. The mad priest tried to form an Anti-Mind with some captured eternals, to defeat any invasion of the Celestials.  Later they were at odds with Apocalypse and briefly posed  as a superhero team called the New Breed.

Memory loss and the Dreaming Celestial
The Eternals began reappearing on Earth in Neil Gaiman's new take on the immortal beings. Most seemed to have no memory of their own history and abilities, except Ikaris, and few records of their previous appearances remain. The Eternal known as Sprite, angered at having to remain an eleven-year-old and unable to grow any further, managed to change reality, inducing collective amnesia in the Eternals as well as distorting their perceptions of history. He used a Uni-Mind with the Dreaming Celestial and other unwilling eternals to achieve his desire, transforming himself in a mortal 11 years old kid.  This can possibly be seen as Gaiman's attempt to retcon some details of the characters; early stories as well as officially published statistics portrayed most of the current generation of Eternals – such as Ikaris and Thena – as being "only" several tens of thousands of years old but Gaiman's run describes them as being closer to a million years old.

Makkari was working as a medicine intern, Sersi was planning to kickstart her party planner business. Meanwhile, Thena was working as a weapons scientist in Stark Industries. She was also married and had a young son. Druig was apparently alive again and he was the Deputy minister of Vorozheika (a fictional post-soviet country). Ikaris contacted Makkari, but he did not believe the eternal's words about the past and rejected him. Then, Makkari met Sersi again, become attracted to her and accompanied her to a party that she was organizing for Druig of Vorozheika. Thena assisted too. In the party, the amnesic Eternals are attacked by mercenaries of another faction of Vorozheika government. The reunion of the four Eternals triggered a recovery of their powers. Ikaris was captured by two deviants and they were experimenting in ways of destroy his body, until that they seemingly killed him with a particle accelerator. However, Ikaris was resurrected by a special machine in the Antarctic base of the Eternals. With their returned powers, Druig took control of Vorozheika. Thena frees herself from the mercenaries that captured her and Makkari went to talk to Sprite, who now was a young celebrity. Sprite trapped the amnesic Eternal and told him  his plans and the reasons why he did the reality changes.

It was uncovered that Ajak had been revived too and that it had been he who contracted the two Deviants. He succeeded in awakening an amnesic Zuras. The two Deviants managed to kidnap Sprite, and the trapped Makkari, using him to awaken the Dreaming Celestial, who was under Golden Gate Park in San Francisco. Upon awakening, the Celestial decided to judge humanity. The Eternals, now remembering their past, arrived in San Francisco, and realizing that they cannot stop the Celestial, decided to leave him be. Makkari was transformed by the Celestial into his spokesman. The Deviants called him Skadrach, and respected him, because the Dreaming Celestial was adored as their god. Sprite was killed by Zuras because of his actions and the rest of the Eternals then embarked on a quest to find and recruit the other members who had similarly forgotten their true selves due to Sprite's trickery.

The Dreaming Celestial told Makkari the reasons for the creation of the Eternals and Deviants, and helped him to find more Eternals. Ajak, jealous of Makkari's new function, manipulated Gilgamesh into killing Makkari. With help of Sersi, Makkari was reborn and the Dreaming Celestial stopped a planned autodestruction. Then the Eternals stopped the invasion of the Horde.

With their numbers completed, and with the new information given by the Dreaming Celestial, the Eternals  debated what to do with mankind and the Deviants—leave them alone, protect them or rule them. They formed another Unimind to decide what to do  and decided to hold themselves apart from the mortal world.

The Final Host
When Celestials literally began "raining" down on Earth, the Avengers are forced to reunite again and just in time to see the arrival of the Final Host which is composed of Dark Celestials that are each physically unique and were the ones who easily took down their brethren. In an attempt to learn more about these new breed of Celestials, Iron Man and Doctor Strange travelled to the Mountains of Greece to try to get some answers from The Eternals. When Stark and Strange arrived, there were no signs of life to be found as almost all of the Eternals were dead, with Strange deducing that the wounds were self-inflicted. Only Ikaris was left barely alive and reveals that the Eternals were never meant to protect Humanity as they thought. Instead, because the Celestials saw the human population as a useful pathogen to act as antibodies against the Horde, the Eternals were created to defend the process under the false impression that they were actually protecting the human race. This discovery drove all Eternals mad which either made them turn against each other or commit suicide. Ikaris is also able to reveal that the only way to prevent the Final Host from unleashing the Horde is the Uni-Mind and sends a message into Stark's mind before dying.

Resurrection and their confrontation with Thanos

A.X.E.: Judgment Day

Powers and abilities
Due to the cosmic energy that suffuses an Eternal's body and the unbreakable mental hold they have over their physiological processes, the Eternals of Earth are effectively immortal. They live for millennia, do not fatigue from physical exertion, are immune to disease and poison, and are unaffected by environmental extremes of cold and heat. Most cannot be injured by conventional weaponry, and even if they somehow are, an Eternal can rapidly regenerate any damage as long as they are able to retain their mental hold over their bodies; this mental bond can be broken. In the 2006 series it was also stated that Eternals are able to absorb oxygen directly from water, and therefore cannot drown. In the same series, Ikaris was plunged into molten metal and experienced great pain, but no physical injury, which the Deviants attributed to a forcefield which protects Ikaris even when unconscious. It is unclear if all Eternals share this degree of protection.

At one time, the official limit to the Eternals' durability was such that they could only be permanently destroyed by dispersing their bodies' molecules over a wide area.
This degree of extreme durability was revealed to have increased to a much greater degree; as demonstrated in the 2006 Eternals limited series, it is shown that even total molecular dispersal is insufficient to destroy an Eternal. As long as "The Machine" (a restoration device of Celestial origin; possibly the Earth itself) keeps running, any destroyed Eternal will eventually return, as was the case with Ikaris after he was completely vaporized by a particle accelerator as part of a series of "experiments" performed upon him by the Deviants.

This same cosmic energy can be channeled for a number of superhuman abilities. All Eternals are potentially capable of:

 Superhuman strength. The limits of their strength can be increased as a result of years of focusing some of their energy towards that purpose.
 Superhuman speed, reflexes, agility, stamina and durability
 Invulnerability
 Immortality
 Accelerated healing
 Projecting concussive blasts, heat, and/or blinding flashes of energy from their eyes and hands
 Flight, and levitating others
 Reading/controlling minds
 Generating illusions
 Teleporting vast distances, though most Eternals prefer not to use this ability as many find it uncomfortable (and according to the 2006 series, it also greatly depletes their store of cosmic energy)
 Transmuting objects, altering both their shape and composition. (The extent of this ability can vary from one Eternal to another).
 Generating force-fields
 In addition, groups of Eternals, as few as three at a time, can initiate a transformation into a gestalt being called the Uni-Mind, a vastly powerful psionic entity that contains the totality of the powers and abilities of all the beings that comprise it.

Some Eternals choose to focus on a particular power to increase their effectiveness with it. Sersi, for example, has developed the power of transmutation further than any other Eternal. Additionally, some Eternals choose to focus their cosmic energies into other, non-standard abilities. Ikaris, for example, channels cosmic energy to greatly enhance his senses, while the Interloper uses his to generate fear in others, and Makkari uses his cosmic energies for superspeed.

Limitations
The 2006 retcon of the Eternals' origins and abilities introduces a significant limitation to their powers, and possibly to their free will, with numerous references to Eternals being "programmed" or "hardwired." They cannot attack their Celestial "masters" for any reason, whether they make a conscious decision to do so or are tricked into accidentally striking the beings. Any such attempt shuts down the body of the attacking Eternal and is implied to be an automatic defense mechanism of the Celestials' armor. On one occasion, when the Eternals attempted to form a Uni-Mind with the intent of keeping the Dreaming Celestial asleep, they were immediately shut down and reverted to their original forms. Furthermore, Eternals are compelled to attack and neutralize any being that attacks a Celestial.

As presented in Gaiman's Volume 3, the Eternals are aware of their role on Earth and the duties and constraints placed on them by the Celestials. Ikaris describes himself as "a humanoid-based repair and maintenance unit left behind by unknowable alien gods to make sure that the earth is still here and in good shape when they get back." Zuras phrased the same concept more philosophically: "We are the Eternals. We are the court of last resort for humanity and for all living things on Earth. [...] We do not choose sides. Countries are lines in the sand, empires rise and fall. We are timeless. We will still be here tomorrow, and a hundred centuries from now."

Members

Generations
The Eternals are split between five different generationals groups:
 First Generation Eternal (those born before the fall of Titanos): Arlok, Astron, Daina, Kronos/Chronos/Chronus, Master Elo, Oceanus, Shastra, Thyrio, Uranos.
 Second Generation Eternal (those alive at the time of Chronus's experiment): Mentor (A'lars), Amaa, Cybele, Forgotten One/Gilgamesh, Helios, Perse, Rakar, Tulayn, Valkin, Virako, Zuras.
Third Generation Eternal (those born after Chronos's experiment but before the Second Host): Aginar, Ajak, Arex, Atlo, Domo, Ikaris, Interloper, Mara, Phastos, Sigmar, Thanos, Thena, Veron, Zarin, Eros
 Fourth Generation Eternal (those born after the coming of the Second Host, 20,000 years ago): Argos, Ceyote, Chi Demon, the Delphan brothers, Druig, Khoryphos, Makkari, Psykos, Sersi, Kingo Sunen, El Vampiro.
 Fifth Generation Eternal (those born after the coming of the Third Host, 3,000 years ago): Aurelle, Sprite, Titanis.

Antecedents
 Arthur C. Clarke's book Childhood's End from 1953 provided inspiration, including the idea of "Overlords" who control Earth's fate and will reveal themselves further after a 50-year waiting period, the idea of demons being humanity's memory of another species, and the "Overmind" concept which seems to influence the comic's "Uni-Mind".
 Mercury and Hurricane, two characters depicted by Jack Kirby through Timely Comics, the 1940s predecessor of Marvel, were retconned as being guises of the Eternal Makkari.

Reception

Accolades 
 In 2007, Eisner Awards nominated Marvel Omnibus  for "Best Archival Collection/Project--Comic Books."
 In 2017, Den of Geek ranked the Eternals 7th in their "Guardians of the Galaxy 3: 50 Marvel Characters We Want to See" list.
 In 2022, Screen Rant included the Eternals in their "10 Most Powerful Hercules Villains In Marvel Comics" list.

Literary reception

Volumes

Eternals - 1976 
Marc Buxton of Den of Geek stated, "Jack Kirby delivered the original electrifying Eternals saga. Other than a Hulk robot (because reasons), there was no mention of the Marvel Universe anywhere in this series. But this was Kirby at his 1970s finest, getting all metaphysical and theological as he combined his imaginative saga with real world legend."

Eternals - 2006 
According to Diamond Comic Distributors, Eternals #1 was the 17th best selling comic book in June 2006. Eternals #2 was the 28th best selling comic book in July 2006. Eternals #3 was the 28th best selling comic book in August 2006.

Jared Gaudreau of CBR.com asserted, "The seven-issue mini-series covered previous themes like creation and did an excellent job expanding Eternals lore and adding numerous new side characters. One of those great additions came in the form of a love interest for Thena named Thomas Eliot." Marc Buxton of Den of Geek wrote, "This is a must read for any fan of American Gods as Gaiman and Romita examine recurring themes of mythology made real and they channel it all through a magnificent Kirby lens. Do not be surprised if the coming film borrows liberally from this fantastic series." Colin Cheney of Fatherly said, "The series is a good, grounded way to enter the Eternals-verse: Romita’s art is appropriately bombastic, and we get some good bang-pow comics action—but it’s also pretty talky (because it’s Neil Gaiman). But also because it’s Neil Gaiman we get a nice right hook to the jaw of the problematic inspiration behind Kirby’s original comic."

Eternals - 2008 
According to Diamond Comic Distributors, Eternals #1 was the 52nd best selling comic book in June 2008.

K. Thor Jensen of PCMag called the Eternals comic book series the "last high-profile attempt to reboot the concept," stating, "This was the bridge that brought the group into the modern era, and it’s a very solid read." Eric Diazof Nerdist included the comic book series in their "Essential Eternals Comics" list, writing, "Daniel Acuna provided memorable pencil art. In this short-lived comic, the Eternals are more intimately tied to the X-Men, with stories that crossed over with the mutant’s time in San Francisco. When the Dreaming Celestial awakens and towers over the mutant home city, it forces the Eternals to take action. Not one of the most well-known runs, and it only lasted eight issues and one Annual. But it is worth a read for sure."

Eternals - 2021 
According to data combined from all direct market distributors, Eternals #1 was the 4th best selling comic book in January 2021.

Matthew Sibley of Newsarama asserted, "Eternals #1 is not just a fresh start for the creative team and for potential readers, but also for the Eternals themselves to define who they are." Barry Thompson of Polygon said, "In terms of execution, Eternals #1 is extremely good. Gillen introduces and entices the uninitiated without bogging itself down with exposition or patronizing anybody who brings some prior knowledge to the table. As far as fulfilling its primary functions, Eternals #1 checks all the necessary boxes." Colin Cheney of Fatherly asserted, "Esad Ribic’s artwork — and the colors by Matthew Wilson — is quite beautiful and cinematic. The storytelling is sharp and clear: Gillen has a witty, wry way of letting his characters reveal themselves and the wider world. We get a good sense of the characters’ personalities (particularly Ikaris and Sprite) quite quickly… And hell: you get a little bit of Iron Man." Adam Barnhardt of Comicbook.com gave Eternals #1 a grade of 4 out of 5, saying, "Readers looking for a strong character-driven story serving study on the likes of Ikaris, Sprite, and the remaining Eternals will find Gillen and Ribić's Eternals #1 to be a delightful read. Readers looking for something akin to a blockbuster event may need to keep looking, save for an epic, applause-inducing cliffhanger. It's an intriguing new start for readers new and old, alike and, at the very least, it's evident this creative team is setting out to establish a definitive take for one of Marvel's biggest unproven ideas."

In other media

Film

The Eternals made their live action debut in a film adaptation for the Marvel Cinematic Universe, released on November 5, 2021 with a focus on Ikaris and Sersi as its central characters. Directed by Chloé Zhao with a script written by her, Patrick Burleigh, Matthew and Ryan Firpo and stars Gemma Chan as Sersi, Richard Madden as Ikaris, Kumail Nanjiani as Kingo, Lia McHugh as Sprite, Brian Tyree Henry as Phastos, Lauren Ridloff as Makkari, Barry Keoghan as Druig, Don Lee as Gilgamesh, Salma Hayek as Ajak and Angelina Jolie as Thena.

Motion comic
 The Eternals appear in the Marvel Knights Animation motion comic DVD Eternals, released on September 16, 2014.

Eternals titles 
Eternals (vol. 1) #1–19 (written and penciled by Jack Kirby, July 1976 - January 1978)
Eternals Annual #1 (written and penciled by Jack Kirby, 1977)
Thor Annual #7 (September 1978)
Thor (vol. 1 ) #283-301 (May 1979 - September 1980)
What If... #23-30 (October 1980 - September 1981)
Iron Man Annual #6 (November 1983)
Avengers (vol. 1 ) #246-248 (August 1984- October 1984)
Eternals (vol. 2) #1–12 (limited series, October 1985 - September 1986)
The Avengers (vol. 1) #308-310 (October 1989 - November 1989)
Eternals: The Herod Factor (November 1991)
Avengers (vol. 1 ) #361, #374-375 (April 1993, May 1994 - June 1994 )
Heroes for Hire (vol. 1 ) #4-7 (November 1997 - January 1998)
The New Eternals: Apocalypse Now (also known as Eternals: The New Breed) #1 (February 2000)
Eternals (vol. 3) #1–7 (written by Neil Gaiman, limited series, Jun. 2006 - February 2007)
Eternals (vol. 4) #1–9, Annual #1 (August 2008 - March 2009)
Hulk (vol 3.) #49 (May 2012)
Thor:The Deviants Saga #2–5 (February 2012 - May 2012)
Avengers (vol. 8) #4 (September 2018)
Eternals (vol. 5) #1–12 (January 2021 – present)  Others include:

The Eternal #1–6 (written by Chuck Austen, with pencils by Kev Walker and inks by Simon Coleby, August 2003 - January 2004)

Collected editions 
A number of the series featuring the Eternals have been collected into trade paperbacks:

The Eternals (collects The Eternals (vol. 1) #1-19 and The Eternals Annual #1, 1976–1978, Marvel Omnibus hardback, 392 pages, July 2006) collected as a softcovers:
Volume 1 (collects The Eternals (vol. 1) #1-11, softcover, 208 pages, July 2008)
Volume 2 (collects The Eternals (vol. 1) #12-19 and The Eternals Annual #1, softcover, 188 pages, October 2008)
Thor: The Eternals Saga:
 Volume 1 (collects Thor Annual #7 and Thor #283-291, softcover, 208 pages, October 2006)
 Volume 2 (collects Thor #292-301, softcover, 216 pages, April 2007)
Eternals (collects Eternals (vol. 3) #1-7, 2006, softcover, 256 pages, Marvel Comics, July 2008, March 2007, Panini Comics, hardcover, 256 pages, May 2007, April 2007)
Eternals:
Volume 1: To Slay A God (collects Eternals (vol. 4) #1-6, softcover, 184 pages, March 2009)
Volume 2: Manifest Destiny (collects Eternals (vol. 4) #7-9 and Eternals Annual, softcover, 104 pages, September 2009)
Eternals:
Volume 1: Only Death Is Eternal (collects Eternals (vol. 5) #1-6, softcover, 136 pages, September 2021)
Volume 2: Hail Thanos (collects Eternals (vol. 5) #7-12, softcover, 160 pages, July 2022)
Eternals: A History Written In Blood  (collects Eternals: Thanos Rises, Eternals: Celestia, Eternals: The Heretic and material from What If? #24-28, softcover, 112 pages, February 2023)

Notes

References 

The Eternals at the Unofficial Handbook of Marvel Comics Creators
The Eternals at the Marvel Directory
 Encyclopaedia Olympianna

External links

Eternals on the Marvel Universe
Eternals at the Marvel Database Project
Know Your Eternals I: The Eternals, Newsarama, April 21, 2006
Know Your Eternals II: Celestials & Deviants, Newsarama, April 25, 2006
Know Your Eternals III: Kirby & The Eternals (I), Newsarama, April 28, 2006
Know Your Eternals IV: The Marvel Universe and The Eternals, Newsarama, May 4, 2006

Reviews

Best Shots Extra: The Eternals #1, Newsarama, June 9, 2008

Comics by Jack Kirby
Comics by Neil Gaiman
Comics by Walt Simonson
Ancient astronauts in fiction
Characters created by Jack Kirby
Fictional characters with superhuman durability or invulnerability
Marvel Comics adapted into films
Marvel Comics characters with accelerated healing
Marvel Comics characters with superhuman strength
Marvel Comics superhero teams
Fictional characters with immortality